The Lydia Eva is the last surviving steam drifter of the herring fishing fleet based in Great Yarmouth, Norfolk. The Great Yarmouth herring fleet had made the town the major herring port in the world in the early part of the 20th century. She is listed as part of the National Historic Fleet.

References

External links
 Lydia Eva and Mincarlo Charitable Trust Limited - official museum site

Museum ships in the United Kingdom
Fishing vessels of the United Kingdom
Great Yarmouth
Ships and vessels of the National Historic Fleet
Museums in Norfolk
1930 ships